James Pax (Born December 21, 1961) is an American actor who has acted in films produced in Hollywood, Hong Kong, and Japan. He is born to an English father and a Chinese mother.

Career 

Once Pax turned his attention to acting, he took on roles in Big Trouble in Little China with Kurt Russell, Year of the Dragon with John Lone, In Love and War with James Woods, Kinjite with Charles Bronson, and Bethune with Donald Sutherland. He also guest starred in numerous television shows and appeared as a series regular on Nasty Boys in 1990. In 1992, he returned to Asia and started acting in the Hong Kong and Japanese movie industries. In 2003 he came to China for the filming of Shanghai Solution in Dalian. Pax appeared in Shanghai Solution, a true story based on the 30,000 Jews who fled to China in the 1940s, which aired on CCTV-8 in August 2005. He also starred in the Discovery Network program The First Emperor: The Man Who Made China in 2006 as Qin Shi Huang.

Filmography

Film

Television

References

External links
 

Japanese male actors
Living people
New York University Stern School of Business alumni
USC School of Cinematic Arts alumni
Place of birth missing (living people)
1961 births